
Gmina Jerzmanowice-Przeginia is a rural gmina (administrative district) in Kraków County, Lesser Poland Voivodeship, in southern Poland.

The gmina contains part of the protected area called Kraków Valleys Landscape Park.

Villages
Gmina Jerzmanowice-Przeginia contains the villages and settlements of Czubrowice, Gotkowice, Jerzmanowice, Łazy, Przeginia, Racławice, Sąspów and Szklary.

Neighbouring gminas
Gmina Jerzmanowice-Przeginia is bordered by the gminas of Krzeszowice, Olkusz, Skała, Sułoszowa, Wielka Wieś and Zabierzów.

References
Polish official population figures 2006

Jerzmanowice-Przeginia
Gmina Jerzmanowice Przeginia